The 2018 UNCAF U-17 Interclub Cup was the 1st edition of the UNCAF U-17 Interclub Cup, Central America's under-17 club football tournament organized by UNCAF.

Teams
Seven teams participated in the tournament.  Honduras sent a national representative.

Group stage

Group A

Group B

Knockout stage

Semifinals

Third place

Final

Top goalscorers

 5 goals:

  Paulo Rodríguez (Alajuelense)

 2 goals:

  Héctor Medrano (Honduras)
  José Aguilera (Honduras)
  Michael Bonilla (Honduras)
  Esly Escobar (Águila)
  Fabián Álvarez (Alajuelense)
  Edgar Castillo (Real Estelí)

 1 goal:

  Paolo Ulloa (Águila)
  César Rodríguez (Águila)
  Edwin Saldívar (Sporting San Miguelito)
  Moisés Barahona (Honduras)
  Gabriel Rodríguez (Alajuelense)
  Bryan Cabrera (Comunicaciones)
  Brian Sierra (Honduras)
  Geancarlo Castro (Alajuelense)
  Xavier Florián (Comunicaciones)
  Walner Vásquez (Real Estelí)
  Franklin González (Real Estelí)
  Juan Arce (Alajuelense)
  Adrián González (Sporting San Miguelito)
  Marvin Ávila (Honduras)
  Esteban Solano (Alajuelense)
  Roberto Martínez (Águila)

References

External links
 UNCAF Website

2018 in Central American football
International association football competitions hosted by Costa Rica